Aransas County is a county located in the U.S. state of Texas. It is in South Texas and its county seat is Rockport.

As of the 2020 census, the population was 23,830. Aransas County is part of the Corpus Christi Metropolitan Statistical Area.

History
Spanish conquistador and cartographer Alonso Álvarez de Pineda was likely the first European to encounter this land when he sailed along the Texas coast in the summer of 1519 and charted Aransas Bay. This name is derived from an outpost established during the Viceroyalty of New Spain called "Río de Nuestra Señora de Aránzazu," which was itself named for the Sanctuary of Aránzazu, a Franciscan sanctuary in Oñate, Guipuscoa, Spain.

In 1871, the Texas Legislature established Aransas County from portions of Refugio County, and it organized the following year.

In August 2017, Hurricane Harvey inflicted tremendous damage on the county.

Geography

Adjacent counties
 Calhoun County (northeast)
 Gulf of Mexico (east)
 Nueces County (southeast)
 San Patricio County (southwest)
 Refugio County (northwest)

National protected area
 Aransas National Wildlife Refuge (part)

Demographics

As of the 2020 United States census, there were 23,830 people, 9,917 households, and 6,303 families residing in the county.

As of the census of 2000, there were 22,497 people, 9,132 households, and 6,401 families residing in the county.  The population density was 89 people per square mile (34/km2).  There were 12,848 housing units at an average density of 51 per square mile (20/km2).  The racial makeup of the county was 87.44% White, 1.43% Black or African American, 0.58% Native American, 2.77% Asian, 0.05% Pacific Islander, 5.33% from other races, and 2.39% from two or more races.  20.32% of the population were Hispanic or Latino of any race.

There were 9,132 households, out of which 27.00% had children under the age of 18 living with them, 57.00% were married couples living together, 9.40% had a female householder with no husband present, and 29.90% were non-families. 25.30% of all households were made up of individuals, and 11.60% had someone living alone who was 65 years of age or older.  The average household size was 2.43 and the average family size was 2.90. As of the 2010 census, there were about 5.9 same-sex couples per 1,000 households in the county.

In the county, the population was spread out, with 23.80% under the age of 18, 6.20% from 18 to 24, 23.20% from 25 to 44, 27.10% from 45 to 64, and 19.70% who were 65 years of age or older.  The median age was 43 years. For every 100 females there were 98.90 males.  For every 100 females age 18 and over, there were 95.50 males.

The median income for a household in the county was $30,702, and the median income for a family was $34,915. Males had a median income of $31,597 versus $20,289 for females. The per capita income for the county was $18,560.  About 15.50% of families and 19.90% of the population were below the poverty line, including 31.00% of those under age 18 and 10.20% of those age 65 or over.

Education 
Most county residents, including the cities of Rockport and Fulton, are served by the Aransas County Independent School District.

Some residents (including the city of Aransas Pass, which is actually outside of the county) are served by the Aransas Pass Independent School District.

Del Mar College is the designated community college for the county.

Transportation

Major highways
  State Highway 35
  State Highway 188

Airport
Aransas County Airport is located in Fulton, north of Rockport.

Communities

Cities 
 Aransas Pass (partly in San Patricio and Nueces counties)
 Corpus Christi (mostly in Nueces County with small parts also in Kleberg and San Patricio counties)
 Rockport (county seat)

Towns 
 Fulton

Census-designated places
 Holiday Beach
 Lamar

Unincorporated communities
 Estes
 Palm Harbor

Ghost towns
 Aransas City

Politics

See also

 List of museums in the Texas Gulf Coast
 National Register of Historic Places listings in Aransas County, Texas
 Recorded Texas Historic Landmarks in Aransas County

References

External links
 Aransas County government
 
 Aransas County from the Texas Almanac
 Aransas County from the TXGenWeb Project
 Historic Photographs of Aransas County
 RockportFulton.com Local Area Guide

 
1872 establishments in Texas
Populated places established in 1872